Dave Smith (born March 23, 1937 in Milwaukee, Wisconsin) is a former American collegiate and professional football player.  A fullback, he attended Greendale High School in Greendale, Wisconsin before playing collegiately for Ripon College and professionally from 1960 through 1964 for the American Football League's Houston Oilers, where he was a member of the AFL's first two championship teams, in 1960 and 1961.  He was selected by Sporting News as the first All-AFL fullback in 1960.  The league did not play an All-Star game that first year, but Smith's 154 carries for 643 yards and 5 touchdowns earned him a berth on the All-League Team. Smith later became a scout for the Buffalo Bills.

See also
Other American Football League players

References

External links
Dave Smith in team photo of 1960 AFL Champion Houston Oilers
Smith's 1961 Fleer football card

1937 births
Living people
Players of American football from Milwaukee
American football fullbacks
Ripon Red Hawks football players
Houston Oilers players
American Football League players
American Football League All-League players